Miguelito may refer to:

Miguelito (singer) (born 1999), Puerto Rican reggaeton singer
Miguelito (footballer, born 1981), Portuguese football wingback
Miguelito (footballer, born March 1990), Portuguese football midfielder
Miguelito (footballer, born December 1990), Spanish football attacking midfielder
Miguelitos, a type of cake